Dunn Township is a township in Otter Tail County, Minnesota, United States. The population was 855 at the 2000 census.

History
Dunn Township was organized in 1880, and named for George W. Dunn, a settler.

Geography

Demographics
At the 2000 census there were 855 people, 388 households, and 287 families living in the township. The racial makeup of the township was 99.77% White, 0.12% from other races, and 0.12% from two or more races. Hispanic or Latino of any race were 0.23%.

Of the 388 households 19.8% had children under the age of 18 living with them, 69.6% were married couples living together, 2.6% had a female householder with no husband present, and 26.0% were non-families. 22.7% of households were one person and 9.3% were one person aged 65 or older. The average household size was 2.20 and the average family size was 2.54.

The age distribution was 17.7% under the age of 18, 3.3% from 18 to 24, 19.4% from 25 to 44, 37.8% from 45 to 64, and 21.9% 65 or older. The median age was 51 years. For every 100 females, there were 109.6 males. For every 100 females age 18 and over, there were 105.2 males.

The median household income was $41,618 and the median family income  was $47,143. Males had a median income of $33,438 versus $21,827 for females. The per capita income for the township was $25,247. About 4.1% of families and 7.9% of the population were below the poverty line, including 7.3% of those under age 18 and 13.8% of those age 65 or over.

References

Townships in Otter Tail County, Minnesota
Townships in Minnesota